The Suits index of a public policy is a measure of tax progressiveness, named for economist Daniel B. Suits.  Similar to the Gini coefficient, the Suits index is calculated by comparing the area under the Lorenz curve to the area under a proportional line.  For a progressive tax (for example, where higher income tax units pay a greater fraction of their income as tax), the Suits index is positive.  A proportional tax (for example, where each unit pays an equal fraction of income) has a Suits index of zero, and a regressive tax (for example, where lower income tax units pay a greater fraction of income in tax) has a negative Suits index.  A theoretical tax where the richest person pays all the tax has a Suits index of 1, and a tax where the poorest person pays everything has a Suits index of −1.  Tax preferences (credits and deductions) also have a Suits index.

Types of tax

Income tax 
By definition, a flat income tax has a Suits index of zero.  However, almost all income tax systems allow for some amount of income to be earned without tax (an exemption amount) to avoid collecting tax from very low income units.  Also, most income tax systems provide for higher marginal tax rates at higher income.  These effects combine to make income taxes generally progressive, and therefore have a positive Suits index.

Sales tax 
Sales taxes are generally charged on each purchase, with no low income exemption.  Additionally, lower income tax units generally spend a greater proportion of income on taxable purchases, while higher income units will save or invest a larger part of income.  Therefore, sales taxes are generally regressive, and have a negative Suits index.

Excise taxes 
Excise taxes are typically charged on items like gasoline, alcohol or tobacco products.  Since the tax rate is typically high, and there is a practical limit to the amount of product that can be consumed, this tax is generally more regressive and has a very negative Suits index.

Properties
The Suits index has the useful property that the total Suits index of a group of taxes or policies is the revenue-weighted sum of the individual indexes. The Suits index is also related closely to the Gini coefficient. While a Gini coefficient of zero means that everyone receives the same income or benefit as a per capita value, a Suits index of zero means that each person pays the same tax as a percentage of income. Additionally, a poll tax has a Suits index equal to the negative of the Gini coefficient for the same group.

Examples

References

Welfare economics
Economic indicators
Fiscal policy
Index numbers